The history of Prague covers more than a thousand years, during which time the city grew from the Vyšehrad Castle to the capital of a modern European state, the Czech Republic.

Prehistory
The land where Prague came to be built has been settled since the Paleolithic Age. Several thousand years ago, trade routes connecting southern and northern Europe passed through this area, following the course of the river. From around 500 BC the Celtic tribe known as the Boii were the first inhabitants of this region known by name. The Boii gave their name to the region of Bohemia and the river Vltava. The Germanic tribe Marcomanni migrated to Bohemia with its king, Maroboduus, in AD 9. Meanwhile, some of the Celts migrated southward while the remainder assimilated with the Marcomanni. In 568, most of the Marcomanni migrated southward with the Lombards, another Germanic tribe. The rest of the Marcomanni assimilated with the invading West Slavs. (The "Migration of Nations" started in the 2nd century; it ended at the end of the 9th and at the beginning of the 10th centuries). The Byzantine historian Prokopios mentions the presence of the Slavs in these lands in AD 512.

According to legend, Princess Libuše, the sovereign of the Czech tribe, married a humble ploughman by the name of Přemysl and founded the dynasty carrying the same name. The legendary princess saw many prophecies from her castle Libusin, which was located in central Bohemia.  (Archaeological finds dating back to the eighth century support the theory of the castle's location).  In one prophecy, it is told, she foresaw the glory of Prague. One day she had a vision: "I see a vast city, whose glory will touch the stars! I see a place in the middle of a forest where a steep cliff rises above the Vltava River. There is a man, who is chiselling the threshold (prah) for the house. A castle named Prague (Praha) will be built there. Just as the princes and the dukes stoop in front of a threshold, they will bow to the castle and to the city around it. It will be honoured, favoured with great repute, and praise will be bestowed upon it by the entire world."

Medieval Prague

From around 900 until 1306, Czech Přemyslid dynasty rulers had most of Bohemia under their control. The first Bohemian ruler acknowledged by historians was the Czech Prince Bořivoj Přemyslovec, who ruled in the second half of the 9th century. He and his wife Ludmila (who became a patron saint of Bohemia after her death) were baptised by Metodej, who (together with his brother Cyril) brought orthodox Christianity and a new alphabet called Glagolitic script to Moravia in 863 which would later be suppressed by the latin Franks. Bořivoj moved his seat from the fortified settlement Levý Hradec to a place called Prague (Praha). Prague Castle was built by Bořivoj around 880, and it is one of the largest castles in the world. Since Bořivoj's reign the area has been the seat of the Czech rulers. Prague Castle became one of the largest inhabited fortresses in Europe. Today, it is the seat of the Czech president.

Bořivoj's grandson, Prince Wenceslas, initiated friendly relations with the Saxon dynasty. Wenceslas wanted Bohemia to become an equal partner in the larger empire. (In a similar way, Bohemia had belonged to Great Moravia in the 9th century and to Samo's empire in the 7th century; both of these empires had been founded to resist the attacks of the Avars). Orientation towards the Saxons was not favoured by his brother Boleslav, and it was the main reason why Prince Wenceslas was assassinated on September 28, 935. He was buried in St. Vitus' Rotunda, the church which he founded. (It stood on the ground where St. Wenceslas' Chapel in St. Vitus Cathedral now is). A few years later Wenceslas was canonised and became Bohemia's most beloved patron saint. (He is "Good King Wenceslas" from the Christmas carol.) In 950, after long war, Boleslav was forced to accept the supremacy of Otto I the Great from the Saxon dynasty, who later became the emperor. From 1002 (definitely 1041) onward Bohemian dukes and kings were vassals of the Holy Roman Emperors and Czech lands appertained to Holy Roman Empire as autonomous territory.
 
By the early 10th century, the area around and below Prague Castle had developed into an important trading centre, where merchants from all over Europe gathered. In 965, an Arab merchant and traveller, called Ibrahim ibn Ya'qub wrote: "Prague is built from stone and lime, and it has the biggest trade centre. Slavs are on the whole courageous and brave... They occupy the lands which are the most fertile and abundant with a good food supply."

In 973, a bishopric was founded in Bohemia with the bishop's palace located on the Prague castle grounds. The first Czech bishop was Vojtěch (St. Adalbert) from the Czech noble family of Slavník, who later evangelized Poles and Hungarians and became a patron saint to Czechs, Poles and Hungarians after his canonization in 999.

Next to the Romanesque fortified settlement of Prague, another Romanesque fortified settlement was built across the river Vltava at Vyšehrad in the 11th century. During the reign of Prince Vratislav II, who rose to the title of King of Bohemia Vratislav I in 1085, Vyšehrad became the temporary seat of Czech rulers.

Prince Vladislav II rose to the title of King of Bohemia Vladislav I in 1158. Many monasteries and many churches were built under the rule of Vladislav I. The Strahov Monastery, built after the Romanesque style, was founded in 1142. The first stone bridge over the river Vltava — the Judith Bridge — was built in 1170. (It collapsed in 1342 and a new bridge, later called the Charles Bridge was built in its place in 1357.)

In 1212, Bohemia became a hereditary kingdom when Prince Přemysl Otakar I rose to the title of King by inheritance from Frederick II (Emperor from 1215), which was legalised in the document called the "Golden Bull of Sicily". The king's daughter, Agnes, became another Bohemian saint. Agnes preferred to enter a convent rather than to marry Emperor Frederick II. During the reign of King Premysl Otakar I, peaceful colonisation started. The German colonists were invited both to Bohemia and Moravia. For hundreds of years this duality of population did not cause any problem - before nationalism had become a world force. 

In the 13th century, towns started to increase in size, driven by institution of German town law and immigration of Germans. Three settlements around the Prague Castle gained the privilege of a town. Across the river Vltava, the Old Town of Prague — Staré Město gained the privilege of a town in 1230, 
The settlement below Prague Castle became the New Town of Prague in 1257 under King Otakar II, and it was later renamed Lesser Town (or Quarter) of Prague — Malá Strana. The Castle District — Hradčany  which was built around its square, just outside Prague Castle, dates from 1320. 

In the 13th century, King Přemysl Otakar II was the most powerful king in the Holy Roman Empire during his reign, known as the "Iron and Golden King". He ruled in Bohemia, Moravia, Austria, Styria, Carniola, Carinthia, Egerland and Friuli. His domain stretched from the Sudetes to the Adriatic sea. Otakar II. hoped that the 6 other prince-electors would choose him as the king of Romans but at imperial election in 1273 the 6 other electors thought that Otakar II. was too risky so they chose a Rudolf I. Habsburg as the emperor. Rudolf Habsburg was a weak ruler which was the primary reason the electors chose him so they could keep their power and land they acquired from the Great Interregnum (1245-1312). Otakar II. himseld being a prince-electors was outraged and wasn't present at Rudolf's coronation. When Rudolf requested that Otakar II. be present at the imperial diet in Nuremberg Otakar refused. Rudolf placed an imperial ban on him which made him lose all his territory acquired during the interregnum.
Otakar's plans weren't to abide to Rudolf and he slowly assembled and army but unfortunately lost and died against Rudolf I. in the battle of Marchfeld on 26 August 1278. His son Wenceslaus II. was still very young and would have to burden the great turmoil that has arisen in Bohemia.

The Přemyslid dynasty ruled until 1306 when the male line died out. The inheriting dynasty was the Luxembourg dynasty when the father of John of Luxembourg emperor Henry VII wanted to prevent Henry of Carinthia to get the bohemian throne so he offered his son John of Luxembourg the bohemian throne if he was to marry the sister of the killed  Wenceslaus III of Bohemia Elizabeth of Bohemia. It took a long time for the young John but he decided to accept. He married Elizabeth on 7 of September 1310 and was now heading to Prague to be crowned. But his rival Henry of Carinthia had claimed the throne before he could arrive. John mustered a large army with the help of his father and when he arrived to Prague Henry of Carinthia ran away allowing John to claim the bohemian throne and be crowned on the 7 of February 1311.

Renaissance
The city flourished during the 14th century during the reign of Charles IV, of the Luxembourg dynasty. Charles was the eldest son of Czech Princess Elizabeth of Bohemia and John of Luxembourg. He was born in Prague in 14 of May 1316 and became King of Bohemia upon the death of his father in 1346. Due to Charles's efforts, the bishopric of Prague was raised to an archbishopric in 1344 and the first archbishop was Arnošt z Pardubic who was a close advisor to Charles. On April 7, 1348 he founded the first university in central, northern and eastern Europe, now called Charles University, the oldest Czech university. In the same year with inspiration of Paris he also founded New Town (Nové Město) with adjacent to the Old Town. Charles rebuilt Prague Castle and Vysehrad, and a new bridge was erected, now called the Charles Bridge. The construction of St. Vitus' Cathedral had also begun. Many new churches were founded. In 1355, Charles was crowned Emperor of the Holy Roman Empire in Rome. Prague became the capital of the Holy Roman Empire. Charles wanted Prague to become one of the most beautiful cities in the world and to make it a new center of art, science and prestige. He wanted Prague to be the dominant city of the whole empire, with Prague Castle as the dominant site in the city and the stately Gothic Cathedral to be more dominant than Prague Castle. Everything was built in a grandiose Gothic style and decorated with an independent art style, called the Bohemian school. During the reign of Emperor Charles IV, the Czech Lands were among the most powerful in Europe.

All that changed during the reign of weak King Wenceslas IV, son of Charles IV. During the reign of King Wenceslas IV—Václav IV—(1378–1419), Master Jan Hus, a preacher and the university's rector, held his sermons in Prague in the Bethlehem Chapel, speaking in Czech to enlarge as much as possible the diffusion of his ideas about the reformation of the church. His execution in 1415 in Constance (accused of heresy) led four years later to the Hussite wars (following the defenestration, when the people rebelled under the command of the Prague priest Jan Želivský and threw the city's councillors from the New Town Hall). King Wenceslas IV died 16 days later. His younger stepbrother Sigismund was the legitimate heir to the throne. But the Hussites opposed Sigismund and so he came to Prague with an army of 30,000 crusaders. He planned to make Prague capitulate and to take the crown. In 1420, peasant rebels, led by the famous general Jan Žižka, along with Hussite troops, defeated Sigismund (Zikmund, son of Charles IV) in the Battle of Vítkov Mountain. There were more crusades, all of which ended in failure. But after Žižka died, the Hussite lost their focus. Eventually they split into groups. The most radical Hussites were finally defeated at the battle of Lipany in 1434 when the moderate Hussites got together with the Czech Catholics. Sigismund became King of Bohemia.

In 1437, Sigismund died. The male line of the Luxembourg dynasty died out. The husband of Sigismund's daughter Elizabeth, Albert II, Duke of Austria, became the Bohemian king for two years (until his death). Then, the next in line for Bohemian crown was the grandson of Sigismund, born after his father's death, and thus called Ladislaw Posthumous (Posthumous because he was born after his father's death). When he died at 17 years old, the nobleman George of Poděbrady, former adviser of Ladislaus, was chosen as the Bohemian king both by the Catholics and by the Utraquist Hussites. He was called the Hussite king. During his reign, the Pope called for a crusade against the Czech heretics. The crusade was led by the King of Hungary Matthius Corvinus who, after the crusade, became also the King of Bohemia. George did not abdicate. Bohemia had two kings. George, before his death, made an arrangement with the Polish King Casimir IV that the next Bohemian king would come from the Jagellon dynasty. (The wife of King Casimir IV was the sister of late Ladislaus Posthumous and so her son Vladislav was related to the Luxembourg dynasty and also to the original Bohemian Premyslovec dynasty). The Jagiellonian dynasty ruled only until 1526 when it died out with Ludwig Jagiellon, son of Vladislaus II Jagiellon.

The next Bohemian king was Ferdinand Habsburg, husband of Ann Jagellon, who was the sister of Ludwig Jagellon. It was the beginning of the Habsburg dynasty. After Ferdinand's brother Charles V resigned in 1556 as Emperor, Ferdinand was elected Emperor in 1558. After he died, his son Maximilian II inherited all his titles and then upon his death, his son Rudolf II inherited them in turn. It was during the reign of Emperor Rudolf II, when there was another glorious time for Prague. Prague became the cultural centre of the Holy Roman Empire again. Rudolf was related to the Jagellon dynasty, to the Luxemburg dynasty and to the Premyslovec dynasty. But he was also related to Spanish Joan the Mad (the daughter of Queen Isabella of Castile and King Ferdinand II of Aragon); Joan was the mother of Rudolf's grandfather. Although Rudolf II was very talented, he was eccentric and he suffered from depression. Emperor Rudolf II lived in Prague Castle, where he held his bizarre courts of astrologers, magicians and other strange figures. But it was a prosperous period for the city; famous people living there included the astronomers Tycho Brahe and Johannes Kepler, the painters Giuseppe Arcimboldo, B. Spranger, Hans von Aachen, J. Heintz and others. In 1609, under the influence of the Protestant Estates, Rudolf II (a devout Catholic), issued an "Imperial Charter of the Emperor" in which he legalised extensive religious freedoms unparalleled in the Europe of that period. Many German Protestants (both Lutherans and Calvinists) immigrated to Bohemia. (One of them was Count J.M. Thurn, a German Lutheran; under his leadership the Second Defenestration of Prague happened in 1618, leading to the Thirty Years' War).

Next in line for Bohemian crown was Rudolf's brother Matthias, but since Matthias was childless, his cousin, the archduke Ferdinand of Styria (related also to Jagellon, Luxemburg and Premyslovec Dynasties), was initially accepted by the Bohemian Diet as heir presumptive when Matthias became ill. The Protestant Estates of Bohemia didn't like this decision. Tension between the Protestants and the pro-Habsburg Catholics led to the Second Defenestration of Prague, when the Catholic governors were thrown from the windows of Prague Castle on May 23, 1618. They survived, but the Protestants replaced the Catholic governors. This incident led to the Thirty Years' War. When Matthias died, Ferdinand of Styria was elected Emperor as Emperor Ferdinand II, but was not accepted as King of Bohemia by the Protestant directors. The Calvinist Frederick V of Pfalz was elected King of Bohemia. The Battle on the White Mountain followed on November 8, 1620. Emperor Ferdinand II was helped not only by Catholic Spain, Catholic Poland, and Catholic Bavaria, but also by Lutheran Saxony (which disliked the Calvinists). The Protestant army, led by the warrior Count J. M. Thurn, was formed mostly from Lutheran Silesia, Lusatia, and Moravia. It was mainly a battle between Protestants and Catholics. The Catholics won and Emperor Ferdinand II became King of Bohemia. He proclaimed the re-Catholicisation of the Czech Lands. Twenty-seven Protestant leaders were executed in the Old Town Square in Prague on June 21, 1621. (Three noblemen, seven knights and seventeen burghers were executed, including Dr. Jan Jesenius, the Rector of Prague University.) Most of the Protestant leaders fled, including Count J. M. Thurn; those who stayed didn't expect harsh punishment. The Protestants had to return all the seized Catholic property to the Church. No faith other than Catholicism was permitted. The upper classes were given the option either to emigrate or to convert to Catholicism. The German language was given equal rights with the Czech language. After the Peace of Westphalia, Ferdinand II moved the court to Vienna, and Prague began a steady decline which reduced the population from the 60,000 it had had in the years before the war to 20,000.

Jewish quarter
The 17th century is considered the Golden Age of Jewish Prague. The Jewish community of Prague numbered some 15,000 people (approx. 30 per cent of the entire population), making it the largest Ashkenazic community in the world and the second largest Jewish community in Europe after Thessaloniki. In the years 1597 to 1609, the Maharal (Judah Loew ben Bezalel) served as Prague's chief rabbi. He is considered the greatest of Jewish scholars in Prague's history, his tomb in the Old Jewish Cemetery eventually becoming a pilgrimage site.

The expulsion of Jews from Prague by Maria Theresa of Austria in 1745 based on their alleged collaboration with the Prussian army was a severe blow to the flourishing Jewish community. The Queen allowed the Jews to return to the city in 1748. In 1848 the gates of the Prague ghetto were opened. The former Jewish quarter, renamed Josefov in 1850, was demolished during the "ghetto clearance" (Czech: asanace) around the start of the 20th century.

18th century
In 1689 a great fire devastated Prague, but this spurred a renovation and a rebuilding of the city. The economic rise continued through the following century, and in 1771 the city had 80,000 inhabitants. Many of these were rich merchants who, together with noblemen, enriched the city with a host of palaces, churches and gardens, creating a Baroque style renowned throughout the world. In 1784, under Joseph II, the four municipalities of Malá Strana, Nové Město, Staré Město and Hradčany were merged into a single entity. The Jewish district, called Josefov, was included only in 1850. The Industrial Revolution had a strong effect in Prague, as factories could take advantage of the coal mines and ironworks of the nearby region. A first suburb, Karlín, was created in 1817, and twenty years later the population exceeded 100,000. The first railway connection was built in 1842.

19th century
In 1806, the Holy Roman Empire ended when Napoleon dictated its dissolution. Holy Roman Emperor Francis II abdicated his title. He became Francis I, Emperor of Austria.

At the same time as the Industrial Revolution was developing, the Czechs were also going through the Czech National Revival movement: political and cultural changes demanded greater autonomy. Since the late 18th century, Czech literature occupied an important position in the Czech culture.

The revolutions that shocked all of Europe around 1848 touched Prague too, but they were fiercely suppressed. In the following years the Czech nationalist movement (opposed to another nationalist party, the German one) began its rise, until it gained the majority in the Town Council in 1861.

In 1867, Emperor Francis Joseph I established the Austro-Hungarian Dual Monarchy of the Austrian Empire and Kingdom of Hungary.

20th century
The next in succession to the Austro-Hungarian throne was Francis Ferdinand d'Este after Crown Prince Rudolf (son of the emperor Francis Joseph I) had committed suicide and after the Emperor's brother (Ferdinand's father) had died. Ferdinand (related also to Jagellon, Luxemburg and Premyslovec Dynasties) was married to Sophie von Chotek from a Czech aristocratic family. They lived in Bohemia at the Konopiste Castle, not far from Prague. He was in favour of a Triple Monarchy, expanding an Austro-Hungary Dualism into Austro-Hungary-Czech Triple Monarchy, but on June 28, 1914 he and his wife were assassinated in Sarajevo. This assassination led to World War I.

World War I ended with the defeat of the Austro-Hungarian Empire and, with the help of Tomas Garrigue Masaryk who was going around the world trying to find political support, the creation of Czechoslovakia. Apart from just having Czechia and Slovakia during the war in 1919 in Austry-Hungary Czechoslovakia was granted Carpathian Ruthenia. Prague was chosen as its capital. At this time Prague was a European city with developed industrial background. In 1930 the population had risen to 850,000.

For most of its history Prague had been an ethnically mixed city with important Czech, German, and Jewish populations. Prague had German-speaking near-majority in 1848, but by 1880 the German population decreased to 13.52 percent, and by 1910 to 5.97 percent, due to a massive increase of the city's overall population caused by the influx of Czechs from the rest of Bohemia and Moravia and also due to the assimilation of some Germans. As a result, the German minority along with the German-speaking Jewish community remained mainly in the central, ancient parts of city, while the Czechs had a near-absolute majority in the fast-growing suburbs of Prague. As late as 1880, Germans speakers still formed 22 percent of the population of Stare Mesto (the Old Town), 16 percent in Nove Mesto (the New Town), 20 percent in Mala strana (the Little Quarter), 9 percent in Hradcany, and 39 percent in the former Jewish Ghetto of Josefov.

When Czechoslovakia gained independence, the Prague Germans experienced discrimination. Prague Mayor Karel Baxa banned the posting of notices in German and the inscription of burial urns in German.

As in Germany and Austria nationalistic and fascist movements gained ground in the first half of the 20th. century, Prague German underwent a revival as German speaking emigrants settled in the town. Famous German speaking writers such as Max Brod, Egon Erwin Kisch, Joseph Roth, Alfred Döblin, Egon Friedell, Franz Kafka, and Leo Perutz wrote for the liberal German language newspaper Prager Tagblatt.

From 1939, when the country was occupied by Nazi Germany, and during World War II, most Jews either fled the city or were killed in the Holocaust. Most of the Jews living in Prague after the war emigrated during the years of Communism, particularly after the communist coup, the establishment of Israel in 1948, and the Soviet invasion in 1968. In the early 1990s, the Jewish Community in Prague numbered only 800 people compared to nearly 50,000 before World War II. In 2006, some 1,600 people were registered in the Jewish Community.

During the Nazi German occupation of Czechoslovakia Prague citizens were oppressed and persecuted by the Nazis. Politicians (e.g. prime minister Alois Eliáš), university professors and students and many others were murdered, imprisoned or sent to concentration camps. Prague was a target of several allied bombings, the deadliest one occurring on February 14, 1945, when large parts of the city centre were destroyed, leaving over 700 people dead and nearly 1200 injured. The Prague uprising started on May 5, 1945 when Prague's Czech citizens, assisted by the defecting 1st Infantry Division of the Russian Liberation Army, revolted against the Nazi German occupiers. That same day, General Patton's American Third Army (with 150,000 soldiers) arrived in Pilsen (only a few hours away from Prague) while Marshal Konev's Soviet Army was on the borders of Moravia. General Patton was in favour of liberating Prague, but he had to comply with the instructions from General D. Eisenhower. General Eisenhower requested the Soviet Chief of Staff to permit them to press forward, but was informed that American help was not needed (a prior agreement from the Yalta Conference was that Bohemia would be liberated by the Red Army). Finally, on May 9, 1945 (the day after Germany officially capitulated) Soviet tanks reached Prague. It was not until May 12, 1945 that all fighting ceased in the Czech Lands. German occupation caused the death of 77,297 Czechoslovak Jews, whose names are inscribed on walls of the Pinkas Synagogue in Prague.

The German army left Prague in the morning of May 8. German-speaking Prague citizens were gathered brutally and expelled from their home city, similar to the expulsions carried out all over Czechoslovakia and Eastern Europe. During this, a number of local massacres occurred resulting in an unknown number of fatalities.

After the war, Prague again became the capital of Czechoslovakia, now without significant Germans and Jews left in the city. Many Czechs genuinely felt gratitude towards the Soviet soldiers. Soviet troops left Czechoslovakia a couple of months after the war but the country remained under strong Soviet political influence. In February 1948, Prague became the centre of a communist coup.

The intellectual community of Prague, however, suffered under the totalitarian regime, in spite of the rather careful programme of rebuilding and caring for the damaged monuments after World War II. At the 4th Czechoslovakian Writers' Congress held in the city in 1967 a strong position against the regime was taken. This spurred the new secretary of the Communist Party, Alexander Dubček to proclaim a new phase in the city's and country's life, beginning the short-lived season of "socialism with a human face". This was the Prague Spring, which aimed at a democratic reform of institutions. The Soviet Union and the rest of the Warsaw Pact, except for Romania, reacted, occupying Czechoslovakia and the capital in August 1968, suppressing any attempt at innovation under the treads of their tanks.

During the communist period little was actively done to maintain the beauty of the city's buildings. Due to the poor incentives offered by the regime, workers would put up scaffolding and then disappear to moonlighting jobs. Vaclavske Namesti (Wenceslas Square) was covered in such scaffolds for over a decade, with little repair ever being accomplished. True renovation began after the collapse of communism. The durability of renovations was aided by the fact that Prague converted almost entirely from coal heating in homes to electric heating. The coal burnt during the communist period was a major source of air pollution that corroded and spotted building façades, giving Prague the look of a dark, dirty city.

In 1989, after the Berlin Wall had fallen, and the Velvet Revolution crowded the streets of Prague, Czechoslovakia freed itself from communism and Soviet influence, and Prague benefited deeply from the new mood. In 1993, after the split of Czechoslovakia, Prague became the capital city of the new Czech Republic. Prague is capital of two administrative units of Czech Republic - Prague region and Central Bohemian Region. As Prague is not geographically part of Central Bohemian Region it is a capital outside of the territory it serves.

Timeline of important moments in Prague history 

The four independent boroughs that had formerly constituted Prague were eventually proclaimed a single city in 1784. Those four cities were Hradčany (the Castle District, west and north of the Castle), Little Quarter (Malá Strana, south of the Castle), Old Town (Staré Město, on the east bank opposite the Castle) and New Town (Nové Město, further south and east). The city underwent further expansion with the annexation of Josefov in 1850 and Vyšehrad in 1883, and at the beginning of 1922, another 37 municipalities were incorporated, raising the city's population to 676,000. In 1938 population reached 1,000,000.

Historical population

The record of 1230 includes Staré Město only
The records of 1370 and 1600 includes Staré město, Nové město, Malá Strana and Hradčany quarters
Numbers beside other years denote the population of Prague within the administrative border of the city at that time.

Further reading
 Becker, Edwin et al., ed. Prague 1900: Poetry and Ecstasy. (2000). 224 pp.
 Burton, Richard D. E. Prague: A Cultural and Literary History. (2003). 268 pp. excerpt and text search
 Cohen, Gary B. The Politics of Ethnic Survival: Germans in Prague, 1861–1914. (1981). 344 pp.
 Fucíková, Eliska, ed. Rudolf II and Prague: The Court and the City. (1997). 792 pp.
 Holz, Keith. Modern German Art for Thirties Paris, Prague, and London: Resistance and Acquiescence in a Democratic Public Sphere. (2004). 359 pp.
 Iggers, Wilma Abeles. Women of Prague: Ethnic Diversity and Social Change from the Eighteenth Century to the Present. (1995). 381 pp. online edition
 Kleineberg, A., Marx, Ch., Knobloch, E., Lelgemann, D.: Germania und die Insel Thule. Die Entschlüsselung von Ptolemaios`"Atlas der Oikumene". WBG 2010. .
 Porizka, Lubomir; Hojda, Zdenek; and Pesek, Jirí. The Palaces of Prague. (1995). 216 pp.
 Sayer, Derek. "The Language of Nationality and the Nationality of Language: Prague 1780–1920." Past & Present 1996 (153): 164–210.  
 Sayer, Derek. Prague, Capital of the Twentieth Century: A Surrealist History (Princeton University Press; 2013) 595 pages; a study of the city as a crossroads for modernity.
 Spector, Scott. Prague Territories: National Conflict and Cultural Innovation in Kafka's Fin de Siècle. (2000). 331 pp. online edition
 Svácha, Rostislav. The Architecture of New Prague, 1895–1945. (1995). 573 pp.
 Wittlich, Peter. Prague: Fin de Siècle. (1992). 280 pp.
 Wilson, Paul. Prague: A Traveler's Literary Companion (1995)
 Prague Top 10 (2011) Prague Top 10

See also

History of the Czech Lands
Famous people connected with Prague
List of rulers of Bohemia
Churches in Prague

References

Bibliography

Chittom,
Lynn-nore. "Prague, Czech Republic." Salem Press Encyclopedia
(2015): Research Starters. Web. 26 Oct. 2015.

Kieval,
Hillel J. "Jewish Prague, Christian Prague, And The Castle In The City's 'Golden Age'." Jewish Studies Quarterly 18.2 (2011): 202–215.

"Prague." Funk & Wagnalls New World Encyclopedia (2014): 1p. 1. Funk & Wagnalls New World Encyclopedia.

Logan, Webb. "Prague: The Czech Republic's 'Dear Little Mother'." World Literature Today 2014: 5.

External links
 myczechrepublic, History of Prague
 conference-consult, History of Prague

 
Populated places established in the 9th century